Mary Seymour was the daughter of Katherine Parr, queen dowager of England and Thomas Seymour, Baron Seymour of Sudeley and uncle to Edward VI.

Mary Seymour may also refer to:
Mary Somerset, Duchess of Beaufort (1630–1715), married name Mary Seymour
Mary Seymour, Duchess of Somerset (1697–1768)
Mary Seymour, Marchioness of Hertford (1846–1909)
Mary Foot Seymour (1846–1893), American writer
Mary Townsend Seymour (1873–1957), American politician